Bo Petersen (born 21 February 1958 Bolbro, Denmark) is a former motorcycle speedway rider who first rode in the UK with the Hackney Hawks. Signed by Len Silver in 1978 he stayed with the Hawks until they closed at the end of the season 1983.

Career
In 1984 Petersen signed for the Swindon Robins. He then had spells with King's Lynn Stars and Wolverhampton Wolves in the top flight of the British League, before joining long-time sponsor Ivan Henry's new club Arena Essex Hammers in 1991.  Henry had combined with Terry Russell to take over the Hammers from former promoter Chick Woodroffe.  Competing in the British League Division Two, Petersen topped the league averages and led Arena to the League Championship, Knockout Cup and Fours Team Championship.  The Hammers gained promotion to the British League Division One in 1992. Petersen achieved a calculated match average of over eight points per meeting in the top flight, but announced his retirement at the end of that season.

During 1993, a serious head injury to Peter Ravn led to Petersen returning to the Hammers to cover his fellow Dane's absence.  The Hammers finished fourth in the League and finished runners-up in a controversial Knockout Cup final.  Petersen, disgusted by off-track incidents, threw his runners-up medal into the crowd at the end of the meeting.. He announced his retirement at the end of the season despite finishing the season calculated match average of over eight points per meeting.

He made one further appearance on a bike at Arena Essex when he rode for a Hammers Dream Team in the Andy Galvin Benefit Meeting in March 1995.

He was a Speedway World Team Cup winner with the Danish speedway team in 1984 and 1985.

World Final Appearances

Individual World Championship
 1984 -  Göteborg, Ullevi - 7th - 9pts

World Team Cup
 1979 -  London, White City Stadium (with Ole Olsen / Hans Nielsen / Mike Lohmann / Finn Thomsen) - 2nd - 31pts (0)
 1984 -  Leszno, Alfred Smoczyk Stadium (with Erik Gundersen / Preben Eriksen / Hans Nielsen) - Winner - 44pts (12)
 1985 -  Long Beach, Veterans Memorial Stadium (with Tommy Knudsen / Erik Gundersen / Hans Nielsen / Preben Eriksen) - Winner - 37pts (0)

References

External links
Hackney Hawks Website
Lakeside Hammers Website

1958 births
Living people
Danish speedway riders
Hackney Hawks riders
Lakeside Hammers riders
Swindon Robins riders
Wolverhampton Wolves riders